Timothy Augustine McNamara (November 20, 1898 in Millville, Massachusetts – November 5, 1994 in North Smithfield, Rhode Island) was a pitcher in Major League Baseball who played from   through  for the Boston Braves and New York Giants.

Over five seasons (1922-26) and 98 appearances including 42 starts, McNamara posted a 14-29 won-loss record with a 4.78 ERA in 395.2 innings pitched with 88 strikeouts and four shutouts.

External links
 Career statistics and player information from Baseball Reference (MLB) and Baseball Reference (MiLB)

1898 births
1994 deaths
Baseball players from Massachusetts
Boston Braves players
New York Giants (NL) players
Fordham Rams baseball players
Major League Baseball pitchers
Millville, Massachusetts
People from North Smithfield, Rhode Island
Sportspeople from Worcester County, Massachusetts
Reading Keystones players
Toledo Mud Hens players
Sportspeople from Providence County, Rhode Island